The  Bina - Katni Passenger or Paanch Sau Paanch (505) is a passenger Train of the Indian Railways, which runs between Bina Junction railway station railway station and Katni South railway station, in the Central Indian state Madhya Pradesh

Arrival and departure
Train no.51601 departs from Bina, and reaches Katni
Train no.51602 departs from Katni, and reaches Bina

Route and halts
The train travels via Saugor. The important halts of the train include:
 Bina Junction railway station
 Malkhedi
 Khurai Baghora
 Khurai
 Khurai Sumreri
 Jeruwakheda
 Isarwara
 Nariaoli
 Saugor
 Saugor Makronia
 Ganeshganj
 Patharia
 Aslana
 Damoh
 Bandakpur
 Sagoni
 KATNI JUNCTION

Coach composite
The train consists of 18 coaches :
 1 AC 3 Tier
 2 AC Chair Car
 1 First Class
 4 Sleeper Coaches
/Chair Car Coach
 8 Unreserved
 1 Ladies/Handy Capped
 1 Luggage/Brake Van

LOCO-SLR-GS-GS-B1-C1-C2-D1-D2-D3-D4-FC1-GS-GS-GS-GS-GS-GS-SLRD

Average speed and frequency
The train runs with an average speed of 35 km/h. The train runs daily.

Loco link
The train is hauled by ET WAM4  electrical engine.

Rake maintenance & sharing
The train is maintained by the Bina Coaching Depot.

See also
Vindhyachal Express
Indore Junction
Bhopal Junction

References

Railway services introduced in 1999
Rail transport in Madhya Pradesh
Slow and fast passenger trains in India